Boris Leonidovich Avrukh (born 10 February 1978 in Karaganda, Soviet Union) is an Israeli chess grandmaster. He was the World Under-12 champion in 1990.

Chess career
Boris Avrukh has played for Israel six times in Chess Olympiads.
 In 1998, at second reserve board at the 33rd Chess Olympiad in Elista (+7 –1 =2);
 In 2000, at third board at the 34th Chess Olympiad in Istanbul (+5 –2 =4);
 In 2002, at first reserve board at the 35th Chess Olympiad in Bled (+3 –3 =3);
 In 2004, at fourth board at the 36th Chess Olympiad in Calvià (+5 –0 =5);
 In 2006, at fourth board at the 37th Chess Olympiad in Turin (+6 –1 =3).
 In 2008, at second/third boards at the 38th Chess Olympiad in Dresden (+2 –2 =4).
He won individual gold medal at Elista 1998 and bronze medal at Turin 2006. He won a team silver medal at Dresden 2008.

In 1999, he tied for 5-6th with Alexander Huzman in Tel Aviv (Boris Gelfand, Ilia Smirin, and Lev Psakhis won). In 2000, he tied for 1st-2nd with Huzman in Biel and took 6th in Haifa (Wydra Tournament; Viswanathan Anand won). In 2001, he won in Biel. In 2004, he tied for 8-9th in Beer Sheva Rapid (Viktor Korchnoi won). In 2009 he tied for first with Alexander Areshchenko in the Zurich Jubilee Open tournament.

Avrukh has twice won the Israeli Chess Championship; in 2000 (tied with Alik Gershon) and 2008. He took part in the FIDE World Chess Championship 2002, but was knocked out in the first round by Bartłomiej Macieja.

Avrukh has published several books, including The Classical Slav.

He cites Garry Kasparov as his favourite player of all time "for his powerful style and killer instinct."

See also
Sports in Israel

References

External links
 
 
  
 Biography
 Published chess books: Grandmaster Repertoire 1: 1.d4 volume one, Grandmaster Repertoire 2: 1.d4 volume two

1978 births
Living people
Chess Olympiad competitors
World Youth Chess Champions
Chess grandmasters
Jewish chess players
Kazakhstani chess players
Israeli chess players
Israeli chess writers
Kazakhstani Jews
Israeli Jews
Israeli people of Kazakhstani-Jewish descent
People from Karaganda